Razali Idris (born 15 July 1966) is a Malaysian politician who has served as Senator since August 2018. He is a member of the Malaysian United Indigenous Party (BERSATU), a component party of the Perikatan Nasional (PN) coalition. He has served as the Information Chief of BERSATU since March 2023. He contested for Hulu Terengganu seat in the 2018 general election representing the Pakatan Harapan (PH) coalition, but lost the election to Barisan Nasional (BN) candidate Rosol Wahid and lost the deposit as his votes did not exceed 12.5% of the total number of votes.

Honours
  :
  Companion Class II of the Exalted Order of Malacca (DPSM) – Datuk (2011)

References

External links 
 Razali Idris on Facebook

1966 births
Living people
Former United Malays National Organisation politicians
Malaysian United Indigenous Party politicians